Mandjet Chasma is a chasma on Pluto's moon, Charon. The chasma is part of a global tectonic belt; a series of canyons, scarps, and troughs that traverse the face of Charon along the northern edge of Vulcan Planum. The feature was discovered using stereoscopic processing of New Horizons images.

See also
 List of geological features on Charon

References

New Horizons